There have been several railroads named for the St. Joseph Valley in southern Michigan and northern Indiana:
St. Joseph Valley Railroad (1848–1869), predecessor of the New York Central Railroad in Michigan
St. Joseph Valley Railroad (1869–1870), predecessor of the Michigan Central Railroad (New York Central Railroad) in Indiana
St. Joseph Valley Railway (1889–1897), earlier St. Joseph Valley Railroad (1880–1889), predecessor of the Pere Marquette Railway in Michigan
St. Joseph Valley Railway (1905), operator of the St. Joseph Valley Traction Company in Indiana